Cătălin Ilie Samoilă (born 12 January 1990) is a Romanian professional footballer who plays as a goalkeeper for Liga IV side Agropoli.

References

External links
 
 

1990 births
Living people
Footballers from Bucharest
Romanian footballers
Association football goalkeepers
Liga I players
Liga II players
FC Progresul București players
FC Sportul Studențesc București players
CS Concordia Chiajna players
FC Delta Dobrogea Tulcea players
CS Luceafărul Oradea players
FC Universitatea Cluj players
FC Dinamo București players
FC Metaloglobus București players
CS Sportul Snagov players
U.S. Agropoli 1921 players